B'nai Israel ( "Sons/Children of Israel") may refer to:

Jewish community
 Bene Israel, a historic community of Jews in India
 Bnei Isro'il, a historic community of Israelites in Central Asia
 Benai Yisrael, the name Samaritans refer to themselves by

Synagogues

Canada
 Congregation B'nai Israel (St. Catharines), Ontario

United States
(by state then city)

California
Congregation B'nai Israel (Daly City, California)
Congregation B'nai Israel (Sacramento, California)

Connecticut
Congregation B'nai Israel (Bridgeport, Connecticut)
Temple B'Nai Israel (New Britain, Connecticut)

Georgia
B'nai Israel Synagogue and Cemetery (Thomasville, Georgia)

Illinois
Anshe Sholom B'nai Israel (Chicago, Illinois)

Indiana
B'nai Israel Synagogue (South Bend, Indiana)

Iowa
B'nai Israel Synagogue (Council Bluffs, Iowa)

Louisiana
B'nai Israel Traditional Synagogue (Alexandria, Louisiana)

Maryland
B'nai Israel Congregation (Rockville, Maryland)
B'nai Israel Synagogue (Baltimore, Maryland)

Mississippi
Temple B'nai Israel (Tupelo, Mississippi)

Missouri
B'Nai Israel Synagogue (Cape Girardeau, Missouri)

New Jersey
Congregation B'nai Israel (Millburn, New Jersey)

New Mexico
Congregation B'nai Israel (Albuquerque, New Mexico)

New York
Bikur Cholim B'nai Israel Synagogue, (Swan Lake, New York)
B'nai Israel Synagogue (Woodbourne, New York)
Congregation B'nai Israel Synagogue, (Fleischmanns, New York)
Temple B'Nai Israel (Olean, New York)

North Dakota
B'nai Israel Synagogue and Montefiore Cemetery, (Grand Forks, North Dakota)

Ohio
Kahal Kadosh Bene Israel (Cincinnati, Ohio)
Congregation B'nai Israel (Toledo, Ohio)

Oklahoma
Temple B'nai Israel (Oklahoma City)

Pennsylvania
Congregation B'nai Israel (Pittsburgh, Pennsylvania)

Tennessee
Temple B'Nai Israel (Jackson, Tennessee)

Texas
Congregation B'nai Israel (Galveston, Texas)

Utah
B'nai Israel Temple (Salt Lake City)

See also

Bani Isra'il (disambiguation)
Banu Israil, Muslim community of India
Ben Yehuda (disambiguation)
Bar Yehuda
Ben-Israel